Austrofestuca, called beach fescue, is a genus of Australian and New Zealand plants in the grass family. The only accepted species is Austrofestuca littoralis, native to seacoast regions in Australia (all states except Queensland) and New Zealand (North I, South I, and Chatham Is).

The genus used to include:
see Hookerochloa 
 Austrofestuca eriopoda – Hookerochloa eriopoda 
 Austrofestuca hookeriana – Hookerochloa hookeriana

See also 
 List of Poaceae genera

References 

Pooideae
Grasses of Oceania
Monotypic Poaceae genera
Taxa named by Jacques Labillardière